Galomecalpa quatrofascia is a species of moth of the family Tortricidae. It is found in Ecuador (Pichincha Province).

Description
The ground colour of the forewings is cream, but glossy whitish along the edges of markings and mixed brownish-ochreous medially. There are four brownish-ochreous fasciae. The hindwings are cream, slightly tinged with yellowish-brown and with grey-brown strigulation.

Etymology
The species name refers to number of fasciae of the forewing and is derived from Latin quatro (meaning four).

References

External links

Moths described in 2009
Fauna of Ecuador
Euliini
Moths of South America
Taxa named by Józef Razowski